Mozambique competed at the 2020 Summer Olympics in Tokyo. Originally scheduled to take place from 24 July to 9 August 2020, the Games were postponed to 23 July to 8 August 2021, because of the COVID-19 pandemic. It was the nation's tenth consecutive appearance at the Summer Olympics.

Competitors
The following is the list of number of competitors in the Games.

Athletics

Mozambique received a universality slot from the World Athletics to send a male track and field athlete to the Olympics.

Track & road events

Boxing

Mozambique entered two female boxers into the Olympic tournament for the first time in history. Acinda Panguana (women's welterweight) and Rady Gramane (women's middleweight) secured their spots by advancing to the final match of their respective weight divisions at the 2020 African Qualification Tournament in Diamniadio, Senegal.

Canoeing

Sprint
Mozambique received an invitation from the Tripartite Commission to send a canoeist in the men's C-1 1000 m to the Olympics.

Qualification Legend: FA = Qualify to final (medal); FB = Qualify to final B (non-medal)

Judo
 
Mozambique qualified one judoka for the men's half-lightweight category (66 kg) at the Games. Kevin Loforte accepted a continental berth from Africa as the nation's top-ranked judoka outside of direct qualifying position in the IJF World Ranking List of June 28, 2021.

Sailing

Mozambican sailors qualified two boats in each of the following classes through the class-associated World Championships, and the continental regattas, marking the country's debut in the sport at the Games.

M = Medal race; EL = Eliminated – did not advance into the medal race

Swimming

Mozambique received a universality invitation from FINA to send two top-ranked swimmers (one per gender) in their respective individual events to the Olympics, based on the FINA Points System of June 28, 2021.

References

Nations at the 2020 Summer Olympics
2020
2021 in Mozambican sport